H35 may refer to:

Vehicles 
 Hanriot H.35, a French training aircraft
 , a Royal Navy H-class destroyer
 Hotchkiss H35, a French tank
 McDonnell H-35, an American experimental gyrodyne

Other uses 
 Clarksville Municipal Airport, in Johnson County, Arkansas, United States
 Shinji language, a Bantu language of the Democratic Republic of the Congo
 H35, a hydrogen station fueling standard
 Tiger Lake-H35, an Intel Tiger Lake mobile processor